Aadil Manzoor Peer, also known as Syed Aadi, is an Indian international ice stock sport athlete. Aadi has a right hand style. He has represented India at an international level. In 2018 Aadil Manzoor Peer represented India in Austria and attained 10th rank.

In the second edition of the Khelo India National Winter Games he won 3 gold medals for Jammu and Kashmir in ice stock events.

Aadil Manzoor Peer secured 4 Gold Medals for Jammu and Kashmir in different 4 events, 1 in Long Distance and 3 with Team in Team Game, Team Target and Team Distance events respectively, in Summer National Ice stock sport Championship.

Aadil Manzoor has been captain of the Jammu and Kashmir ice stock sport state team since 2018.

Career 
Aadil Manzoor started his sports journey from playing Rugby and Pencak Silat, Peer switched over to Ice stock sport in 2012 which was a new sport to him; since then he has been achieving milestones at national and international levels.

Hailing from Halmatpora village in north Kashmir’s Kupwara district, Peer was trained by a coach Irfan Aziz Botta to improve his ice stock skills.

He initially had dreamt of becoming a professional rugby player from his early school days and started playing Rugby in 2007, at the age of 12, for the J&K. He was introduced to ice stock sport by Botta and Mohammad Iqbal.

Seeing his competence and performance selectors picked him for the Nationals which were to be held in Gulmarg in which President of International Federation Ice stock sport, Manfred Shaffer was invited as a Special Guest to introduce the Ice stock in the Country. He won a gold medal there. When he was very new to Ice stock sport at the national arena, he got the impulse to continue his journey with Ice stock sport.

Peer is considered one of the most popular Ice Stock Sports Athletes from Asia. He has numerous national titles to his name and has won 16 Gold medals, 4 Silver medals from 2013 to date in the National Icestock Championships.

Keeping his focus on the game, Peer became captain of Team India in the ‘Team Distance Event’ in the International Ice stock championship recently held in Ritten, Italy, from 21 to 27 February, where Team India was ranked 8th in the world with an aggregate score of 230.11 meters in Ice stock throws.

Tournaments Record

See also 

 Ice stock sport
 Sports in Jammu and Kashmir
 Ice stock sport at the Winter Olympics

References 

Sportspeople from Jammu and Kashmir
Ice stock sport
Indian sportsmen
Indian athletes
Kupwara district
Living people
1997 births